Mark Klett (born 9 September 1952) is an American photographer. His work is included in the collections of the Smithsonian American Art Museum, the Museum of Fine Arts Houston and the Museum of Modern Art, New York.

Life
Klett was born in Albany, New York. After graduating from St. Lawrence University with a B.S. in Geology in 1974, he worked as a photographer with the U.S. Geological Survey. In 1977, he completed the MFA program at Visual Studies Workshop in Rochester, New York studying with Nathan Lyons.

He is a Regents Professor and teaches photography at Arizona State University.

Work 

Klett's photographic work focuses on the western landscape and man’s interaction with it. In particular, his photographs respond to historic images and his projects explore relationships between time, change and perception.

He is particularly known for his rephotography projects, recently with collaborator Byron Wolfe, which included western landscapes, Yosemite, the Grand Canyon, and Glenn Canyon.

Publications
Second View: The Rephotographic Survey Project. With Ellen Manchester and JoAnn Verburg, University of New Mexico Press, 1984.
Traces of Eden: Travels in the Desert Southwest. David R. Godine, 1986.
Headlands: the Marin Coast at the Golden Gate. With Miles De Coster, Mike Mandel,Paul Metcalf, and Larry Sultan, University of New Mexico Press, 1989.
One City/Two Visions. Bedford Arts Publishers, San Francisco, CA, 1990.
Photographing Oklahoma. 1889-1991. Oklahoma City Art Museum, 1991.
Revealing Territory. University of New Mexico Press, 1992.
Capitol View: A New Panorama of Washington DC. With Merry Foresta, Smithsonian Institution and Book Studios, 1994.
Desert Legends: Restoring the Sonoran Borderlands. With Gary Paul Nabhan, Henry Holt, 1994.
The Black Rock Desert. With Bill Fox, University of Arizona Press, 2002. .
Third Views, Second Sights, A Rephotographic Survey of the American West. Museum of New Mexico Press, 2004. With Byron Wolfe. .
Yosemite in Time: Ice Ages, Tree Clocks, Ghost Rivers. With Rebecca Solnit and Byron Wolfe, Trinity University Press, 2005. .
After the Ruins: Rephotographing the 1906 San Francisco Earthquake and Fire. University of California Press, 2005. .
Mark Klett: Saguaros by Gregory McNamee and Mark Klett. Radius Books, 2007. .
The Half Life of History, with William Fox. Radius Books, 2011.  
Reconstructing the View, the Grand Canyon Photographs of Mark Klett and Byron Wolfe, with Byron Wolfe, Rebecca A. Senf, Stephen J. Pyne. University of California Press, 2012. 
Camino del Diablo, Radius Books, 2017. With Raphael Pumpelly  
Drowned River: The Death and Rebirth of Glen Canyon on the Colorado, with Rebecca Solnit and Byron Wolfe. Radius Books, 2018.  
Seeing Time: Forty Years of Photographs, Anne Wilkes Tucker, Keith E. Davis, Rebecca A. Senf. University of Texas Press, 2020.

Awards
1979: Emerging Artist Fellowship for the National Endowment for the Arts
1982: National Endowment for the Arts Fellowship
1984: National Endowment for the Arts Fellowship
1993: Photographer of the Year from Friends of Photography
Japan/U.S. Creative Artist Fellowship
2001: Regents' Professor, Arizona State University
2004: Guggenheim Fellowship

Collections
Klett's work is held in the following permanent collections:
Museum of Fine Arts Houston
Museum of Modern Art, New York: 33 prints (as of 26 September 2021)
Smithsonian American Art Museum

References

External links

The collaborative works of Mark Klett and Byron Wolfe
Collection of Mark Klett photos at the Center for Creative Photography, University of Arizona.

1952 births
Living people
American photographers
United States Geological Survey personnel
St. Lawrence University alumni
Artists from Albany, New York
Arizona State University faculty
Scientists from New York (state)
Visual Studies Workshop alumni